The Hampen Formation is a Jurassic geological formation of Bathonian age found in central Southern England. Dinosaur remains diagnostic to the genus level are among the fossils that have been recovered from the formation. This formation was formerly known as the Hamden Marly Formation or the Hamden Marly Beds.

Paleofauna
Cetiosaurus sp (sauropod indet)

See also

 List of dinosaur-bearing rock formations
 List of stratigraphic units with few dinosaur genera

Footnotes

References
 Weishampel, David B.; Dodson, Peter; and Osmólska, Halszka (eds.): The Dinosauria, 2nd, Berkeley: University of California Press. 861 pp. .

Bathonian Stage